The 2017 World RX of South Africa was the twelfth and final round of the fourth season of the FIA World Rallycross Championship. The event was held at the Killarney Motor Racing Complex in Cape Town, Western Cape.

Supercar

Heats

Semi-finals
Semi-Final 1

Semi-Final 2

Final

Standings after the event

References

External links

|- style="text-align:center"
|width="35%"|Previous race:2017 World RX of Germany
|width="40%"|FIA World Rallycross Championship2017 season
|width="35%"|Next race:2018 World RX of Barcelona
|- style="text-align:center"
|width="35%"|Previous race:None
|width="40%"|World RX of South Africa
|width="35%"|Next race:Incumbent
|- style="text-align:center"

South Africa
World RX